Cicli Pinarello S.p.A. is an Italian bicycle manufacturer based in Treviso, Italy. Founded in 1953, it supplies mostly handmade bicycles for the road, track, E-bikes(NYTRO), mountain bikes  and cyclo-cross. The company also produces an in-house component brand – MOST.

History
Giovanni Pinarello was born in Catena di Villorba, Italy in 1922. He was the eighth of 12 brothers. At the age of 15, Giovanni began making bicycles at the factory of Paglianti. After a successful amateur career he turned professional in 1947, aged 25. Pinarello died on 4 September 2014.

Originally, all Pinarello frames were steel.  Pinarello used Columbus tubing for most of the 1980s but with tubing by Oria in the lower models in 1989. The first non-Italian tube was Tange Prestige for the US-based Levis Cycling team headed by Michael Fatka and ridden by Andrew Hampsten, Steve Tilford, Roy Knickmann, Thurlow Rogers in the mid-1980s. As noted above, the Banesto Line introduced in 1993 exclusively utilized Oria tubing: Oria Cromovan, Oria ML34, and Oria ML25.  Throughout the 1990s until 2004, Pinarello produced frames from conventional steel tubing using lugs, oversize tubing, oversize aluminium with TIG welded joints, magnesium and frames of carbon fiber and other materials.

Models

Historical models

The Pinarello Montello SLX was a landmark model for Pinarello as this was the frame with which Pinarello achieved their first major pro victories. This model frame was one of the most responsive of the mid to late 1980s as shown by wins in events such as the 1984 Summer Olympics Road Race, Vuelta a España, the Giro d'Italia and stages of the Tour de France. The Montello had a brake cable through the top tube, chrome sloping front fork and chrome on the drive side chain stay; later models had the full rear triangle chromed.  The Montello SLX was in red, blue and Spumoni.  Pinarellos from the mid-1980s often have the decals restored by owners as factory-applied decals where prone to flaking off.
The Montello was fabricated from Columbus SLX butted tubing with rifling down the inside center. The bottom bracket was investment cast with the Pinarello logo and the dropouts were by Campagnolo. Braze-ons for down-tube shifters, front derailleur and two water bottles were provided. The GPT logo (for Giovanni Pinarello, Treviso) appeared in many locations.

The Pinarello Treviso was the second-in-line model under the Montello SLX in the mid-to-late '80's.  Built with Columbus SL tubing, it featured a painted fork and seat stays, with chromed chain stays. This model also featured the sloping fork crown.  On the road it is easily distinguished from the Montello by the single chrome chain stay. However, some older models of the Treviso (1981) did not have the chrome chain stay.

After the Montello SLX, Pinarello departed from his standard production design with parallel seat and head tube angles and created the Gavia.  This provided more saddle setback than the Montello or other Pinarello designs. Greg LeMond, the winner of the Tour de France in 1986, 1989 and 1990, promoted designs that pushed the saddle further back.  The Gavia was constructed of Columbus TSX tubing.  This model was available in red, blue with pearl white panels and pearl white with fluorescent splatter.

The Banesto Line was released in 1993 following Miguel Indurain's first two Tour de France (1991 and 1992) and first Giro d'Italia (1992) wins. Based upon Indurain's preference, all Banesto Line frames were constructed with Oria tubing. The Banesto Line was headlined by Indurain's Time Trial bike, debuting at the 1992 Giro with a remarkable advance in steel frames as it featured Tig welded custom aerodynamic tubing and custom aerodynamic seat post with internal shifter and brake cable routing. This TT bike represented an early example, possibly the first, of experimentation with airfoil tubing in the pro peloton. Only three of these TT framesets are known to have been constructed. Prior to the 1992 Giro, Indurain had ridden a Banesto painted TT bike with a round tubeset. The Banesto Line included the Tig welded Ciclo Cromovan Record 93, the Ciclo ML 34 Record 93 with a chromed fork and chrome rear triangle as well as the Ciclo ML 25 Veloce 93. The Banesto Line were supplied with Campagnolo components, Mavic rims, Aci Inox spokes, Vittoria tires, ITM handlebars and Indurain's preferred Selle Italia Turbo saddles. Riding his Pinarello Banesto Line bicycles, Indurain was the last cyclist to win the Tour on a steel bicycle. In 1997, the steel Banesto Line had changed from the white frames to utilize standard Pinarello blue and white color schemes along with Banesto badging on the downtube. In 1998, the Banesto Line included the new Paris aluminum frameset and updated Pinarello logo.

The Pinarello Paris in the mid-1990s was a 7005 series aluminium bike with an aluminium fork later replaced by the aria carbon fork. It was upon this frame that Jan Ullrich and Bjarne Riis won the Tour de France. Winner of the 2007 Editor's Choice award for a road racing bicycle from Bicycling Magazine, the Pinarello Paris FP is the premier monocoque, high modulus, unidirectional carbon fiber frame. In 2009, the FP6 replaced the Paris FP and F4:13.  The monocoque frame uses the same mold as the Paris FP, but with different carbon fiber (30HM3K).
Pinarello has been slow to jump aboard the all-carbon juggernaut, preferring to concentrate on its highly regarded magnesium-frame technology as showcased in the Dogma series of bikes. But the attraction and momentum of carbon is unavoidable, and while the all-carbon F4:13 hasn't displaced the Dogma at the top of Pinarello's line-up, it is clearly a serious and purposeful attempt to use the material's properties to best advantage, starting with one-piece main frame construction to exploit carbon's stiffness and low weight.

Contemporary road models
The Pinarello FP Uno was the current base model bicycle built by Pinarello evolving from its predecessor, the FP1. The FP Uno features hydroformed asymmetric 6061 T6 triple butted aluminium tubing. The next superior model is the Pinarello FP Due. Like the FP Uno, this has evolved from its predecessor, the FP2. The frame is constructed from 24HM12K carbon fibre. The Pinarello FP Quattro is built from 30HM12K carbon fibre and features carbon asymmetric stays with Onda carbon forks. The Quattro also utilises the new iCR internal cable routing system, which has been developed in house, by Pinarello.

The Pinarello Neor replaced the FP Uno as Pinarellos base road bike model, featuring the same hydroformed aluminum frame as the FP Uno, but now boasts a carbon fibre rear triangle as well as ONDA carbon front forks. The Pinarello FPTEAM Carbon is constructed from 24HM12K uni-directional carbon fibre and features both tapered 1 "1/8 1" 1/4 ONDA front forks and ONDA rear triangles. The Pinarello Rahza is a full 24HM12K carbon fibre frame, featuring an asymmetrical monocoque design which improved frame rigidity. The frame also features ONDA forks and rear stays as well as the BB30 bottom bracket. The Pinarello Marvel is an entirely new asymmetry frame originating from the Pinarello Paris (constructed from Torayca 50HM1.5 carbon fibre) made from 30HM12K carbon. Rigidity of the frame is further improved by the usage of a tapered headset (1" 1/8 - 1" 1/2) as well as featuring internal cable routing. Pinarello say that the Marvel is "top level bike and already UCI approved for use in official competitions." The Marvel also makes full use of the Think2 system allowing the usage of both electronic and mechanical groupsets. Other new features include the new ONDA2V front fork and a new aerodynamic downtube.

GAN series
For 2016 Pinarello updated their product line starting with new mid-level bikes up to models just below the Dogma Series. All GAN Series models take styling and design cues from the Dogma F8. The entry level GAN stems directly from the design efforts of the Dogma F8, whilst having a less 'extreme' style which aids riding comfort. The GAN Disk variant contains the same features as the GAN but also includes disk brakes, both models are manufactured from T600 carbon fibre. The GAN S features an all T700 carbon fibre frame, whilst still maintaining design features akin to the F8. The top of the class model is the GAN RS which features a higher strength T900 Toray carbon.

Dogma series

The Pinarello Dogma was the first of the current top line of bicycle made by the company and was the first bicycle of a 'new generation' of frames, it is the successor to the Pinarello Prince range and was released for sale to the public in 2010. The frames focus around a completely asymmetric design made entirely of 60HM1K carbon fibre, with the right hand side of the Dogma frame is different in shape and section to that of the left side, thus providing increased rigidity against forces placed upon the frame by the action of pedalling.

In 2011 the successor the Dogma, the Pinarello Dogma 2 was revealed at the 2011 Tour de France. The Dogma 2 featured aerodynamic improvements which increased the efficiency of the frame.
Bradley Wiggins rode the Dogma 2 to victory in the 2012 Tour de France. In 2012, mountain bike trials rider, Martyn Ashton, created a video in which he performed several tricks and stunts on a Dogma 2. The video, entitled "Road Bike Party", went viral, gaining over half a million views in one day, and it currently has over eight million views on YouTube.

The Pinarello Dogma K features Pinarellos 'Century Ride' geometry and uses frame design that provides increased comfort without compromising the overall performance. As with other modern Pinarellos, the frame incorporates an asymmetric design which offsets the asymmetric forces created during the pedalling. The Dogma K and the Dogma frame differ from each other in the angle of the seat tube, brought back to increase shock absorption, and reduced head tube angle as well as slightly longer chain stays to increase comfort. Furthermore, a longer wheelbase makes for a frame that is less rigid vertically, improving shock absorption. The Pinarello ROKH is a frame that was made in an effort to offer the excellent performance of the DOGMA K to a wider group of cyclists. The ROKH's geometry is similar in shape and construction but with an even longer wheel base to add even more vertical compliance than the Dogma K. The Dogma K Hydro mirrors the new model variation seen with the Dogma 65.1, whereby hydraulic disc brakes have now been added. The Hydro features new ONDA HD (Hydraulic Disc) forks, as well as new chainstays accommodating the RAD braking system seen on both the DOGMA XC and Dogma 65.1 Hydro.

The 2013 generation of the Dogma bicycle is the Dogma 65.1 Think2. When compared to the Dogma2, the Think2 features stronger and more rigid carbon fibre, 65HM1K, yielding a more reactive frame. Moreover, the Think2 has been built with the new electronic shifting group sets in mind, and thus has internal cable routing for both Shimano and Campagnolo systems. The 2014 Dogma 65.1 Hydro variant of the Dogma is virtually the same as the 2013 Think2 model, made from Torayca 65Ton HM 1K carbon fibre with "Nanoalloy technology". The Hydro however, accommodates hydraulic disc brakes and features a new front fork developed from the previous ONDA2 fork, called the ONDA HD (Hydraulic Disk). The frame also features new chainstays which accommodate the new RAD braking system, derived from the development of the Dogma XC. Chris Froome rode the Dogma 65.1 Think2 to victory in the 2013 Tour de France.

In May 2014 the Pinarello Dogma F8 was revealed as part of Pinarellos 2015 product launch, with the name deriving from this particular Dogma model being the 8th generation. The new bike was developed in conjunction with Team Sky sponsor and car manufacturer Jaguar and takes design cues (such as the front fork shape) from the Bolide time trial bike. Research advancements have led to claimed aerodynamic gains, with the F8 being 26.1% more aerodynamic than the Dogma 65.1, 6.4% more aerodynamic when including the bike rider and the frameset alone being 40% more aerodynamically efficient than the predecessor. The bike is expected to debut at the 2014 Critérium du Dauphiné.

The bike was designed in conjunction with Jaguar and features the aerodynamic fork from the Dogma F8, which in conjunction with the suspension system is claimed to reduce vibrations by 50%, with data from Jaguar-Land Rover showing an increase in speed of 8% and a reduction in energy usage of 10%. A version of the bike will also be made which does not have the suspension system built in - the Dogma K8. In May 2015, the company launched the Dogma F8 Disk in preparation for the UCI's review on the use of disk brakes in road competitions. The bike is essentially the same as the standard F8 in terms of performance and characteristics. In December 2015, the company launched a limited edition variant of the F8, the Dogma F8w, which uses the wireless SRAM RED eTap groupset. In 2016, just before the 2016 Tour de France the company launched the Dogma F8 Xlight.

In January 2017, the company revealed its new flagship bike, the Dogma F10. Unlike in previous years where Pinarello have timed their new product reveals with the Giro d'Italia, the F10 was revealed before the start of the 2017 season. The  team-bikes will be equipped with Shimanos newest 9150 Dura-Ace Di2 groupset, whilst Pinarello claim the F10 is 6.3% lighter and 7% stiffer than its predecessor (still composed of Torayca T1100 1K carbon), whilst a 53 cm unpainted frame has a claimed weight of only 820g. The F10 also has a 12.6% claimed aerodynamic advantage over the F8, coming in part from the 'concave' back shaped aerofoils (also found on the second version of the Bolide time trial bike). The F10 also has a number of aerodynamic devices which have been taken from other models, the aforementioned Bolide, as well as Bradley Wiggins' hour record bike. Only hours after its release, Taiwanese bike manufacturer - Velocite -  claimed that new F10 and the second version of the Bolide infringe three of its patents. The F10 will also be available to the public immediately. During the 2017 Giro d'Italia a number of  riders tested the Dogma F10 X-Light - a lightweight version of the F10 - in readiness for the 2017 Tour de France. Pinarello claim an unpainted X-Light weighs in at 760g for a 53 cm sized frame. In mid-July the company announced the Dogma F10 Disc would be produced for sale. A day later the company revealed the Dogma K10, taking aerodynamic and visual cues from the F10 forebearer and the electronically controlled suspension variant, the Dogma K10S Disk.

In May 2019, the company revealed the successor to the Dogma F10, the Dogma F12 which is launched alongside Team Ineos.

Time trial and triathlon models
Following the success of Pinarello's first experiment with aero tubing in Indurain's 1992 Banesto Line time trial bike, Pinarello developed the carbon monocoque Espada with input from Formula 1 expert Giacchi for the 1994 Hour Record attempt.  This was Pinarello's first carbon frame. Indurain succeeded in setting a new standard on the Espada by breaking 53 kph for the first time with a mark of 53.040 kph. Indurain gained further success on the Espada in the 1995 Tour, winning both long time trials, before returning to a Banesto Line frame to win the 1996 Olympic time trial.

The Pinarello Montello FP8 was a time trial bicycle manufactured by Pinarello prior to the introduction of the Graal. It was made with aerospace grade carbon fibre composite. The 50HM3K carbon fibre creates an ultra stiff and light ride.
The Pinarello Graal is a time trial frame manufactured by Pinarello. The Graal was designed using CFD techniques, maximizing the efficiency of the bicycle. The frame is available in both an electronic version and mechanical version, with the electronic version featuring an internally mounted battery.
The Pinarello Bolide was released on 2 May 2013 with gains of a 15% reduction in aerodynamic drag and 5% reduction in weight over the Graal. Team Sky's 2012 Tour de France winner Sir Bradley Wiggins used the new bike at the 2013 Giro d'Italia. The Bolide has been in development for over year with both Pinarello lab technicians and Team Sky working on the bike. The Bolide uses aeroplane wing-shaped tubular sections in conjunction with a 'concave back' on the seat tube. This allows the rear wheel and frame to be closer together. In addition, the brakes are shielded behind leading small fairings and the frame utilizes integrated cabling to further minimize drag.

On 21 June 2013 Pinarello released their second (in-house developed) high end time trial frame within two months, called the Pinarello Sibilo. The Sibilo will debut at the 2013 Tour de France with Alejandro Valverde of Movistar Team. Early impressions are that the Sibilo shares some common features with the Bolide, such as; airfoil tubing, track style rear dropouts and a 'concave back'. Moreover, the Sibilo carries some aerodynamic refinements over the Bolide, for example, the front brake is further integrated into the forks and the rear brake has been moved towards the chainstays. These modifications remove the need for the brake fairings which are seen on the Bolide. The Sibilo is constructed from the same Torayca 65HM1K carbon as the Bolide, with internal cable routing for extra aerodynamic benefit. The Sibilo utilizes the stiff BB86 bottom bracket and can also accommodate both mechanical groupsets such as the Shimano Dura-Ace and Campagnolo Super Record sets, as well as their electronic variants (Dura-Ace Di2 and Campagnolo EPS).
The Pinarello Xirion is designed specifically for triathletes by utilizing favorable frame geometry and is made from 24HM Unidirectional carbon fibre. The Xirion is sold as a complete bicycle fitted with Vision cycling components.

In light of Bradley Wiggins' hour record attempt, Pinarello collaborated with Jaguar to produce the Bolide HR. The HR variant has aero-optimised front forks, seat stays and dropouts. The bike also features printed titanium bars. In 2015, the endurance part of the Italian national cycling team received Bolide HR bikes. At the 2016 UCI Track Cycling World Championships, Filippo Ganna rode his Bolide HR to victory in the Individual Pursuit.

In May 2016, three years after its initial introduction, the Pinarello Bolide TT was released exclusively to Team Sky. The first race-ready model of the bike will be given to Mikel Landa for use on the Stage 9 time trial at the 2016 Giro d'Italia.

Gallery

Awards and Sponsorship

Awards
Cyclingnews.com "Best road bike" -  Dogma F8, 2016
London Design Award  -  Dogma F8, 2014

Sponsorship
Pinarello has sponsored professional teams since 1960. Teams include Team Telekom, Banesto, Caisse d'Epargne, Del Tongo, Fassa Bortolo, Team Sky, Movistar Team, British Cycling and British UCI Continental team Velosure-Giordana Racing Team.

Significant victories
This is an incomplete list, you can help by expanding it...

1984
1st  Olympic Road Race, Alexi Grewal
1988
1st  Overall Tour de France, Pedro Delgado 
1991
1st  Overall Tour de France, Miguel Indurain
1st  Overall Giro d'Italia, Franco Chioccioli
1st  Mountains classification Vuelta a España, Luis Herrera
1992
1st  Overall Giro d'Italia, Miguel Indurain
1st  Intergiro Classification Giro d'Italia, Miguel Indurain
1st  Overall Tour de France, Miguel Indurain
1993
1st  Overall Giro d'Italia, Miguel Indurain
1st  Overall Tour de France, Miguel Indurain
1994
1st  Overall Tour de France, Miguel Indurain
1995
1st  Overall Tour de France, Miguel Indurain
1st  World Time Trial Championships, Miguel Indurain
1996
1st  Overall Tour de France, Bjarne Riis
1st  Points classification, Erik Zabel 
1st  Young rider classification, Jan Ullrich
1st  Olympic Time Trial, Miguel Indurain
1997
1st  Overall Tour de France, Jan Ullrich
1st  Points classification, Erik Zabel 
1st  Young rider classification, Jan Ullrich
1st  Mountains classification Vuelta a España, José María Jiménez
1st Milan–San Remo, Erik Zabel 
1998
1st  Points classification Tour de France, Erik Zabel 
1st  Young rider classification Tour de France, Jan Ullrich
1st  Mountains classification Vuelta a España, José María Jiménez
1st Milan–San Remo, Erik Zabel 
1st  World Time Trial Championships, Abraham Olano
1999
1st  Overall Vuelta a España, Jan Ullrich
1st  Mountains classification Vuelta a España, José María Jiménez
1st  Points classification Tour de France, Erik Zabel 
1st  World Time Trial Championships, Jan Ullrich
2000
1st  Olympic Road Race, Jan Ullrich
1st  Points classification Tour de France, Erik Zabel 
1st  Points classification Giro d'Italia, Dimitri Konyshev
1st Milan–San Remo, Erik Zabel 
1st Giro di Lombardia, Raimondas Rumšas
2001
1st  Points classification Tour de France, Erik Zabel 
1st  Points classification Vuelta a España, José María Jiménez
1st  Mountains classification Vuelta a España, José María Jiménez
1st Milan–San Remo, Erik Zabel 
1st  World Time Trial Championships, Jan Ullrich
2002
1st  Points classification Vuelta a España, Erik Zabel 
1st Giro di Lombardia, Michele Bartoli
2003
1st  Young rider classification Tour de France, Denis Menchov
1st  Points classification Vuelta a España, Erik Zabel 
1st Giro di Lombardia, Michele Bartoli
2004
1st  Points classification Giro d'Italia, Alessandro Petacchi
1st  Points classification Vuelta a España, Erik Zabel 
2005
1st  Points classification Vuelta a España, Alessandro Petacchi
1st Milan–San Remo, Alessandro Petacchi
2006
1st  Overall Tour de France, Óscar Pereiro
2012
1st  Overall Tour de France, Bradley Wiggins
2013
1st  Overall Tour de France, Chris Froome
1st  Mountains classification, Nairo Quintana
1st  Young rider classification, Nairo Quintana
1st  World Road Race Championships, Rui Costa
2014
1st  World Time Trial Championships, Bradley Wiggins
2015
1st  Overall Tour de France, Chris Froome
1st  Mountains classification, Chris Froome
1st  World Time Trial Championships, Vasil Kiryienka
2016
1st  Overall Tour de France, Chris Froome
1st Liège–Bastogne–Liège, Wout Poels
2017
1st Milan–San Remo, Michał Kwiatkowski 
1st  Overall Tour de France, Chris Froome
1st  Overall Vuelta a España, Chris Froome
1st  Points classification, Chris Froome
1st  Combination classification, Chris Froome
2018
1st  Overall Giro d'Italia, Chris Froome
1st  Mountains classification, Chris Froome
1st  Overall Tour de France, Geraint Thomas
2019
1st  Overall Tour de France, Egan Bernal
2020
1st  Overall Giro d'Italia Tao Geoghegan Hart
1st  World Time Trial Championships, Filippo Ganna
1st  Olympic Road Race, Richard Carapaz
1st  Olympic Cross-country, Tom Pidcock
1st  Olympic Team Pursuit, Filippo Ganna
2021
1st  Overall Giro d'Italia,  Egan Bernal
1st  World Time Trial Championships, Filippo Ganna

See also

 List of bicycle parts
 List of Italian companies

References

External links

 

Cycle manufacturers of Italy
Cycle parts manufacturers
Electric bicycles
Manufacturing companies established in 1952
Italian companies established in 1952
Mountain bike manufacturers
Italian brands
Companies based in Veneto
Sporting goods manufacturers of Italy
Companies based in Treviso